Goodnight, My Love is a 1972 American television film directed by Peter Hyams.

Plot
In 1946 Los Angeles Susan Lakely visits private detectives Francis Hogan and Arthur Boyle when her boyfriend Michael Tarlow does not call for four days. Upon visiting his apartment the detectives are attacked by an unknown assailant who flees. They press Susan for more information about her boyfriend's associates but she claims to be unaware of the nature of his business. After questioning further people at the horse track they visit a nightclub and speak with Julius Limeway, who is also searching for Tarlow. Together the detectives must see through Susan's lies and discover the truth behind Tarlow's disappearance.

Cast
Richard Boone as Francis Hogan
Michael Dunn as Arthur Boyle
Barbara Bain as Susan Lakely
Victor Buono as Julius Limeway
Gianni Russo as Michael Tarlow

Production
Hyams had just made T.R. Baskin, which he produced and had written the script but did not direct. He was finding it difficult to get the chance to direct a feature film so moved into television. "It was at a time when television was considered like a bath of sulfuric acid, and if you stuck your toe in it you'd pull out a stump," he says.

He later recalled:

Barry Diller was head of Movies of the Week at that point over at ABC. Barry green-lit Duel for Steven Spielberg, a movie called Binary for Michael Crichton, and gave a lot of us our first breaks. I said to Barry 'I've got two ideas. The first is about the U.S. government faking a moon shot, then trying to cover it up.' He said "What's the other one?" I said, 'I'm a Raymond Chandler freak. I want to do a 1940s detective story about a private eye and his dwarf sidekick.' He said "Do that one."

The film starred Richard Boone and Michael Dunn. Hyams:

Richard Boone was a terrific actor. He had one of the most amazing faces. He, uh, liked to drink a bit. (laughs) I remember the first shot he did for me; we literally had to prop him up. But when we cut it all together, it worked great ...  Michael was one of the most gifted people I ever met, just a remarkable man. He also sang like an angel ... He was in terrible pain constantly. It was a real gift to have made my first movie with him. I wish we could have done more.

Reception
The Los Angeles Times called the film "marvelously funny ... admirably written and directed by Peter Hyams with just the right touch." The New York Times called it "delightful".

Hyams later said the film was "over-praised. One of the trades called it the Citizen Kane of television movies, which, trust me, it wasn't." However it did launch his career.

References

External links

1972 television films
1972 films
Films directed by Peter Hyams
ABC Movie of the Week
American detective films
Films with screenplays by Peter Hyams
Films set in Los Angeles
Films set in 1946
1970s American films